Don Lucia (born August 20, 1958) is an American former ice hockey head coach, who was named as inaugural commissioner of the second Central Collegiate Hockey Association (CCHA) on June 17, 2020. The CCHA, which is set to start play in the 2021–22 season, is a revival of an NCAA Division I men's hockey conference whose original version operated from 1971 to 2013 before folding in the wake of massive conference realignment in the sport.

Coaching career
Lucia is best known for his 19-season tenure as head coach of the Minnesota Golden Gophers men's hockey team (1999–2018).  He twice led the Golden Gophers to the NCAA national championship title, in 2002 and 2003. Under Lucia, the Golden Gophers won four MacNaughton Cups (awarded to the WCHA's regular season champion), the Broadmoor Trophy three times (awarded to the WCHA playoff champion), and the Big Ten regular season championship in each of that league's first four seasons.  He coached one Hobey Baker Award winner, Jordan Leopold. He is one of 10 coaches to record more than 600 NCAA men's ice hockey wins, and one of four to win national titles in consecutive years. Lucia graduated from the University of Notre Dame in 1981, where he played defense for the school's hockey team.

During the 2008–2009 season, Lucia was diagnosed with sarcoidosis, but only missed four games while battling the autoimmune disease. This illness, combined with a growing number of college hockey players taking their talents to the NHL, led Lucia's Gophers to a 17–18–2 record during the 2009–2010 season. That season was Lucia's only year with a losing record with the Gophers, and his first since coaching Alaska-Fairbanks in the 1991–1992 season.

The Gophers eventually returned to the top of the WCHA, winning back-to-back conference titles in 2012 and 2013. In the summer of 2013 Minnesota joined with 5 other schools to form the Big Ten's ice hockey division. The Gophers won the inaugural regular season title and advanced all the way to the National Championship game where they fell to Union. Lucia won the first 4 Big Ten titles, but could only garner 1 conference tournament championship (2015) and despite the success in the Big Ten, Minnesota was not considered a contender for the NCAA title most years.

Minnesota finished 5th in 2018 and with many of the fans unhappy with the direction of the program, Lucia resigned after 19 years behind the bench.

Personal life
Lucia and his wife Joyce have four children.

Both his sons were drafted in the NHL Entry Draft. Tony was selected in the 6th round of the 2005 NHL Entry Draft by the San Jose Sharks and Mario was selected in the 2nd round of the 2011 NHL Entry Draft by the Minnesota Wild.

Head coaching record

See also
List of college men's ice hockey coaches with 400 wins

References

External links
Minnesota bio

1958 births
American men's ice hockey defensemen
Central Collegiate Hockey Association commissioners
Ice hockey people from Minnesota
Living people
Minnesota Golden Gophers men's ice hockey coaches
Notre Dame Fighting Irish men's ice hockey players
People from Grand Rapids, Minnesota
Philadelphia Flyers draft picks
Alaska Nanooks men's ice hockey coaches
Colorado College Tigers men's ice hockey coaches
Ice hockey players from Minnesota
Ice hockey coaches from Minnesota